Frederick Vroom (11 November 1857 – 24 June 1942) was a Canadian actor of the silent film era. Vroom appeared in more than 70 films between 1912 and 1939, mostly in supporting roles and bit parts. He played featured roles in Buster Keaton's films The Navigator (1924) and The General (1926). He was born in Clementsport, Nova Scotia, Canada and died in Hollywood, California from a heart attack.

Partial filmography

 A Ticket to Red Horse Gulch (1914, Short) as Bill Salter, the Old Miner
 A Gentleman of Leisure (1915) as Macklin, Pitt's friend
 Fighting Bob (1915) as President
 The Invisible Enemy (1916) as Governor Webster
 The Jungle Child (1916) as Seqor Grijalva
 The Serpent's Tooth (1917) as Matthew Addison-Brown
 The Shackles of Truth (1917) as Governor Coningsby
 New York Luck (1917) as Peter Van Loon
 The Gown of Destiny (1917) as Sir John Cunningham
 Betty Takes a Hand (1918) as Peter Marshall
 I Love You (1918) as Prince del Chinay
 Little Red Decides (1918)
 Restitution (1918) as Joseph
 High Tide (1918) as Dr. Temple
 She Hired a Husband (1918) as Mr. Trowbridge
 Fighting Through (1919) as Braxton Warren
 Secret Marriage (1919) as Lieutenant MacLaren
 Where the West Begins (1919) as Luther Caldwell
 The Island of Intrigue (1919) as Tomas Waring
 Devil McCare (1919) as Vera's Father
 One of the Finest (1919) as Robert Fulton Hudson
Upstairs (1919) as James Barrison
 The Beloved Cheater (1917) as Mr. Challoner
 The Prince of Avenue A (1920) as William Tompkins
 The Triflers (1920) as Janet's Father
 The Six Best Cellars (1920) as Mrs. Teak
 A Tokyo Siren (1920) as Mr. Chandler
 The Misfit Wife (1920) as Dr. Morton
 The Kentucky Colonel (1920) as General Buck Hineman
 The Marriage Pit (1920) as Edwin Rossiter
 813 (1920) as Prefect of Police
 The Great Lover (1920) as Doctor
 The Faith Healer (1921) as Matthew Beeler
 White and Unmarried (1921) as Mr. Welter
 The Heart Line (1921) as Oliver Payson
 The Great Impersonation (1921) as Prince Terniloff
 The Millionaire (1921) as Delmar
 The Lane That Had No Turning (1922) as Governor General
 The Fourteenth Lover (1922) as Mr. Marchmont
 The Man of Courage (1922) as Morgan Deane
 The Primitive Lover (1922) as Mr. Graham
 The Woman Who Walked Alone (1922) as Marquis of Champneys
 A Tailor-Made Man (1922) as Harvey Benson
 The Glorious Fool (1922) as Mr. Lindley Grant
 The Tiger's Claw (1923) as Colonel Byng
 The Day of Faith (1923) as Marley Maynard
 The Acquittal (1923) as Carter Ames
 Sporting Youth (1924) as John K. Walker
 Phantom Justice (1924) as Dr. Wills
 The Reckless Age (1924) as Owen Jephson
 Hutch of the U.S.A. (1924) as Grover Harrison
 His Hour (1924) as English Minister
 The Navigator (1924) as John O'Brien (uncredited)
 Idaho (1925) as David Cameron
 Eyes Right! (1926) as Col. Thomas A. Davis
 The General (1926) as A Southern General
 The Terrible People (1928) as Clayton Shelton
 The Poor Millionaire (1930) as Attorney Wallace
 The Mighty Barnum (1934) as Henry Wadsworth Longfellow (uncredited)
 Woman Against Woman (1938) as Justice of the Peace (uncredited)
 Second Fiddle (1939) as Minor Role (uncredited)
 Mr. Smith Goes to Washington (1939) as Paine's Friend (uncredited)

External links

1857 births
1942 deaths
Canadian male film actors
Canadian male silent film actors
20th-century Canadian male actors
Canadian expatriate male actors in the United States